While Mexico Sleeps (Spanish:Mientras México duerme) is a 1938 Mexican crime film directed by Alejandro Galindo and starring Arturo de Córdova, Gloria Morel and Miguel Arenas. The film's art direction is by Jorge Fernandez.

Cast
 Arturo de Córdova as Federico La Cierva 
 Gloria Morel as Margarita  
 Miguel Arenas as Méndez  
 Alberto Martí as Jefe de policia  
 Gaby Macias as Cantante 
 Ramón Vallarino as Roberto
 Carlos López
 Gilberto González as Germán 
 Roberto Banquells
 Armando Velasco
 Víctor Manuel Mendoza
 Raúl Guerrero
 Alfonso Bedoya
 Arturo Turich  
 Elena Ureña
 Emma Duval  
 Armando Soto La Marina

References

Bibliography 
 Spicer, Andrew. Historical Dictionary of Film Noir. Scarecrow Press, 2010.

External links 
 

1938 films
1938 crime films
Mexican crime films
Film noir
1930s Spanish-language films
Films directed by Alejandro Galindo
Films set in Mexico
Mexican black-and-white films
Films scored by Manuel Esperón
1930s Mexican films